Aaital Khosla is an Indian model and beauty queen. She was crowned Glamanand Supermodel India in the year 2015 and represented India at Miss Earth 2015 pageant held in Vienna, Austria.

Personal life and career

Early life and education
Aaital was born in Chandigarh in a business/political family. She attended St. Stephen's School, Chandigarh and went to MCM DAV College for Women for further studies.

Career and beauty pageants
In December 2015, she competed in Femina Miss India Delhi contest held at Hyatt Regency, Gurgaon, placed in the Top 6 and won "Miss Fashion Icon" sub-award. The same year she participated in Palash National Beauty Pageant Chandigarh 2015 contest and was declared 1st Runner Up. Later, she got entry to Palaash National Beauty Pageant 2015 and was crowned the eventual winner.

She competed at the second edition of Glamanand Supermodel India, the national preliminary for Miss Earth pageant in India and was crowned the winner at the conclusion of the final event held on 4 November 2015 at Courtyard Marriott Hotel in Gurgaon. Apart from winning the main title she also won three special awards at the pageant, Miss Internet, Miss Eco-Tourism and Miss Productive Beauty. She succeeded Mohini Raaj Puniya as Glamanand Supermodel India and Alankrita Sahai as Miss Earth India.

Aaital represented India at the Miss Earth 2015 pageant held in Marx Halle, Vienna, Austria.

Controversy
In November 2015, Miss Earth India's video representing Aaital went into a big controversy as the videography team showed Mount Everest as an attempt to showcase Himalaya. It became popular and was taken down within 24 hours and a new video was uploaded. It was cleared by the national director Nikhil Anand that the mistake was done was the videography team and the video was taken down as soon as the mistake was realised. She later apologised from her Facebook page.

References

External links
 Aaital Khosla at Miss Earth official website
 Aaital Khosla @ Miss Earth India Official website with past MEI winners
 Femina Miss India Delhi

Living people
Femina Miss India
Beauty pageant contestants from India
Indian beauty pageant winners
Miss Earth 2015 contestants
Female models from Mumbai
1993 births
Female models from Chandigarh
Miss Earth India delegates